The Roman Catholic Diocese of Mohale's Hoek is a diocese located in the city of Mohale’s Hoek in the ecclesiastical province of Maseru in Lesotho.

History
 November 10, 1977: Established as Diocese of Mohale’s Hoek from Metropolitan Archdiocese of Maseru

Ordinaries

Bishops of Mohale's Hoek
 Sebastian Koto Khoarai, O.M.I. (1977-2014) (elevated to Cardinal in 2016)
 John Joale Tlhomola (2014–present)

See also
Roman Catholicism in Lesotho

References

External links
 GCatholic.org 
 Catholic Hierarchy 

Mohale's Hoek
Christian organizations established in 1977
Roman Catholic dioceses and prelatures established in the 20th century
1977 establishments in Lesotho
Mohale's Hoek
Roman Catholic Ecclesiastical Province of Maseru